The 1899 Baylor Bears football team was an American football team that represented Baylor University as an independent during the 1899 college football season. This was the first football season for Baylor. Under head coach R. H. Hamilton, the team played all four games at home in Waco, Texas, compiling a 2–1–1 record.  Initially, Baylor played its home games on an undetermined field near the university.   Baylor played its first game against Texas A&M, which would become a rivalry, the Battle of the Brazos, with over 100 games played in the series by 2003.

Schedule

References

Baylor
Baylor Bears football seasons
Baylor football